Umara D. Gomwalk is a Nigerian academic. He was the first Vice Chancellor of Federal University of Technology Owerri and  the 10th Vice Chancellor of the University of Nigeria, Nsukka . He was also  professor emeritus of Medicine of University of Nigeria Nsukka.  He preceded to Ginigeme Francis Mbanefoh as the sole administrator of the institution. His administration had crises to deal with from its take over of VC role from Oleka Udeala until handing over in 1999 with Ginigeme Francis Mbanefoh.  Gomwalk was at various times a teacher and Chairman, Presidential Advisory Council and the Governing Council of the Nigerian National Merit Award. He died on May 12, 2019 at the age of 83.

References 

Living people
Year of birth missing (living people)
Place of birth missing (living people)
Academic staff of the University of Nigeria
Vice-Chancellors of the University of Nigeria